Charmallaspis is a genus of beetles in the family Cerambycidae, containing the following species:

 Charmallaspis pulcherrima (Perty, 1832)
 Charmallaspis smithiana White, 1850

References

Prioninae